Mark Andrew Chapman (nicknamed Chappers) (born 11 October 1973) is a British television and radio presenter who, mainly working in sport, presents Match of the Day 2 on BBC One and Sky Sports' coverage of the EFL Cup. He also hosts Sports Report on BBC 5 Live, one of the longest-running programmes on British radio, and the world's longest-running sports radio programme, plus The Monday Night Club with Micah Richards.

Early life
Chapman was born in Rochdale, Lancashire, but spent most of his youth in Sale on the other side of the city of Manchester. He attended Manchester Grammar School, and during his time there developed an interest in radio, wanting to work for Radio 1 from the age of 13. He went on to gain a degree in French and Business Studies from the University of Hull.

Broadcasting career
Chapman began his career in 1996 as a continuity announcer on BBC Television, primarily working on BBC Two, before becoming the cricket correspondent for BBC North East radio. 

Chapman then joined BBC Radio 1 as a Newsbeat sportsreader working on Sara Cox's show and later on Scott Mills's show, where he was nicknamed Chappers, before joining BBC Radio 5 Live to host 5 live Sport on Monday evenings in 2010. Between 2009 and 2013, Chapman was the main stand in presenter on Final Score, Match of the Day 2 and other BBC Sport programmes as well as co-hosting Pardon The Interruption and live football events on ESPN. Following the departure of Colin Murray, Chapman became the main host of Match of the Day 2 in August 2013, and also became the main host of the BBC's coverage of Rugby League that year.

In August 2016, Chapman replaced Mark Pougatch as the main presenter of 5 live Sport on Saturday afternoons, and he continues to host the Monday evening edition of the programme alongside other midweek shows. In 2016, he became the presenter of The NFL Show and NFL This Week, with Osi Umenyiora and Jason Bell. He left the show in November 2020.

In May 2022, in addition to his work with the BBC, it was announced that Chapman had joined Sky Sports to present its coverage of the Carabao Cup.

Career
Chapman's became Chair of the Board for the Manchester Originals cricket team for The Hundred in July 2021.

In November 2022, Chapman extended his sports portfolio to become Non-Executive Director at Vanarama National League team, Altrincham Football Club.

Charitable work
In March 2008, Chapman and Comedy Dave ran a mile at all 20 English Premier League clubs and the 12 Scottish Premier League clubs. In the same year, he also completed the London Marathons for children's cancer charity CLIC Sargent; repeating the feat in 2010. In 2012, Chapman was part of a team that cycled from Land's End to John o' Groats in aid of the Donna Louise Children's Hospice Trust in Stoke-on-Trent.

Writing
Chapman wrote a regular column for Shoot Monthly magazine. In 2010, he released his first book, entitled Heroes, Hairbands and Hissy Fits: Chappers' History of Modern Football, in which he gives a harsh critique of modern football and players both professional and part-time.

Personal life
Chapman married his wife Sara in 2001. They lived in Hale, Greater Manchester until she died after a long battle with cancer in 2020. He has three children Ben, Jessie and Millie. In 2021, he started a relationship with PR consultant Nina Sawetz.

Chapman is a Manchester United football fan. He is also a fan of Hull F.C. owing to his time at university in Hull.  Chapman is a fan of the Chicago Bears in the NFL.

References

External links
 
 Profile – Mark Chapman BBC Radio 1

1973 births
Living people
BBC newsreaders and journalists
BBC Radio 5 Live presenters
BBC Radio 1 presenters
BBC sports presenters and reporters
British radio DJs
English rugby league commentators
National Football League announcers
People educated at Manchester Grammar School
People from Rochdale
People from Sale, Greater Manchester